Bernard Schweizer (née Bernhard Schweizer, born, 1962) is a professor of English at Long Island University, Brooklyn. He has published several books and essay collections on topics in British and European literatures. He is a leading Rebecca West scholar and has edited or co-edited a number of Rebecca West’s previously unpublished and uncollected works. In 2003, he founded the International Rebecca West Society in New York and was the second president of the Society.

In 2013, Schweizer founded another scholarly organization, the International Society for Heresy Studies, whose vice-president he currently is. Heresy studies is designed to provide an intellectual platform for philosophers, literary critics, theologians, historians, and artists who are interested in the dialectic between heterodoxy and orthodoxy, and who want to explore dissenting and heretical ideas outside of both confessional and anti-religious frameworks. 

Schweizer is a proponent of sympathetic approaches to heterodox, rebellious, and challenging ideas expressed in literature and culture, and his most influential book to date, an interdisciplinary work titled Hating God: The Untold Story of Misotheism is devoted to humanists who believe in God yet deny that he is benevolent. Schweizer's most recent book, Christianity and the Triumph of Humor: From Dante to David Javerbaum traces the development of Christian religious comedy through the ages to show that humor was able to conquer all conceivable Christian taboos while delivering significant artistic and intellectual benefits. Using history, literary criticism, theology, philosophy, and social science, Schweizer demonstrates that what begun with grotesque scenes in Dante's hell ended with unfettered comical irreverence in the work of David Javerbaum. 

Schweizer is a naturalized American citizen, born in Switzerland. His education included elementary schooling at the Waldorf School in Biel, Switzerland, an apprenticeship in health care, autodidactic study for the federal Swiss baccalaureate, backpacking around the world, two years of college study at the University of Lausanne, a B.A. in English earned at the University of Minnesota (Twin Cities Campus), and a Ph.D. in English literature from Duke University in 1997. Schweizer held a teaching and research appointment at the University of Zurich from 1996-1999, he was a research fellow for the Swiss National Science Foundation from 2000-2002, and he joined the faculty of Long Island University in 2002.

Works
Monographs:
 Christianity and the Triumph of Humor: From Dante to David Javerbaum (Routledge, 2019)
 Hating God: The Untold Story of Misotheism (Oxford University Press, 2010)
 Radicals on the Road: The Politics of English Travel Writing in the 1930s (University of Virginia Press, 2001)
 Rebecca West: Heroism, Rebellion, and the Female Epic (Greenwood, 2002)

Essay Collections:
 Reading Heresy: Religion and Dissent in Literature and Art (Critical Insights Series), co-edited with Gregory Erickson (DeGruyter, 2017)
 The Hero's Quest (Critical Insights Series), co-edited with Robert Segal (Salem Press, 2012)
 Not So Innocent Abroad: the Politics of Travel and Travel Writing co-edited with Ulrike Brisson (CSP, 2009)
 Approaches to the Anglo and American Female Epic (Ashgate, 2006)
 Rebecca West Today: Contemporary Critical Approaches (University of Delaware Press, 2007)

Editions of Rebecca West:
 The Return of the Soldier by Rebecca West, co-edited by Bernard Schweizer and Charles Thorne (Broadview Press, 2010)
 The Essential Rebecca West: Uncollected Prose by Rebecca West (Pearhouse Press, 2010)
 Survivors in Mexico by Rebecca West (Yale University Press, 2003)
 Woman as Artist and Thinker by Rebecca West (iUniverse, 2005)

References

External links
 Bernard Schweizer's homepage

1962 births
Living people
20th-century Swiss people
American literary critics
American academics of English literature
Duke University alumni
University of Minnesota College of Liberal Arts alumni
Long Island University faculty
Men and feminism